Isospora ashmoonensis  is a species of internal parasites classified under Coccidia. It was first identified in a blackcap in Egypt.

References

Conoidasida
Parasites of birds